Bird Noises is the first extended play by Australian rock group, Midnight Oil, which was released on 24 November 1980 under the band's own independent label, Powderworks Records / Sprint Music. It was produced by Leszek Karski and manufactured and distributed by CBS/Columbia. Bird Noises reached the Top 30 on the Australian Kent Music Report Singles Chart.

Background
On 24 November 1980, Australian rock music group, Midnight Oil, released their first four-track extended play, Bird Noises. At the time Midnight Oil consisted of Peter Garrett on lead vocals and harmonica; Peter Gifford on bass guitar and backing vocals; Rob Hirst on drums and backing vocals; Jim Moginie on lead guitar and keyboards; and Martin Rotsey on lead guitar. It was the first recording by the band to feature Gifford who had replaced the band's earlier bass guitarist, Andrew James.

It was produced by former Supercharge band member Leszek Karski for Powderworks Records and Sprint Music label at Music Farm Studios in Byron Bay and distributed internationally by the CBS/Columbia Records. The track, "Wedding Cake Island", refers to the island of the same name off Coogee Beach, Sydney. In 1990 the EP was re-released, on CD, in the United States by Columbia Records.

Reception

Bird Noises peaked at No. 28 on the Australian Kent Music Report Singles Chart. According to Australian musicologist, Ian McFarlane, Bird Noises "continued the development heard on Head Injuries, with 'No Time for Games' and 'I'm the Cure' being particularly impressive. Bird Noises also boasted the anomalous, but delightful Shadows-like instrumental 'Wedding Cake Island'". AllMusic's William Ruhlman noted the group had tried "some musical variations after two albums of hard rock ... the music in fact was restrained, and the group tried acoustic instruments and a moody instrumental for an intriguing change of pace from their usual style".

Track listing

Charts

Certifications

Personnel
Midnight Oil
 Peter Garrett – lead vocals, harmonica
 Peter Gifford – bass guitar, backing vocals
 Rob Hirst – drums, backing vocals
 Jim Moginie – lead guitar, keyboards
 Martin Rotsey – lead guitar

Production work
 Producer – Leszek Karski (for Instant Relief)
 Engineer –  Ross Cockle
 Mixer – Leszek Karski
 Studio – Music Farm Studios, Byron Bay; mixed at Studios 301, Sydney.

Credits:

References

External links
 

1980 debut EPs
Midnight Oil EPs
Sprint Music albums